Tim Cole (1960–1999) was an American student wrongly convicted of rape.

Tim or Timothy Cole may also refer to:

Timothy Cole, wood engraver
Tim Cole (diplomat)
Tim Cole (balloonist)